Social Genocide is a 2004 Argentine documentary film directed by Fernando Solanas. The film highlights numerous political, financial, social and judicial aspects that mark out Argentina's road to ruin.

Synopsis
After the fall of the military dictatorship in 1983, successive democratic governments launched a series of reforms purporting to turn Argentina into the world's most liberal and prosperous economy. Less than twenty years later, the Argentinians have lost literally everything after a regression into statism: major unprofitable national companies have been sold well below value to foreign corporations; the proceeds of privatizations have been diverted into the pockets of corrupt officials in a country that is traditionally an important exporter of foodstuffs, malnutrition is widespread; millions of people are unemployed and sinking into poverty; and their savings have disappeared in a final banking collapse.

The film tries to compose a vivid picture of the situation that the country underwent a military dictatorship from 1976 until the outbreak of the revolt of 19 and December 20, 2001. It was twenty five years of terrible economic and social problems hidden by the period of peace and tranquillity facing the country. Argentina passed in record time of prosperity to the need because of the exorbitant national debt, the rampant corruption in political power and the financial sector and the plundering of public assets.

It happened with the complicity of numerous multinational companies and the complicity of international government agencies. Pretende expose the mechanisms of this catastrophe, demonstrating the dignity and courage of millions of Argentines struggling not to sink into poverty. Fernando E. Solanas directs this film that exposes the certainty that "another world is possible" in the face of globalization. "Follow the looting." Pino Solanas said that nothing has changed since 2003, charged with his documentary "Memory of Plunder" the plundering of resources by multinational corporations with the complicity of the national government.

References

External links
 

2004 films
Documentary films about Argentina
Documentary films about economics
Films directed by Fernando Solanas
2000s Spanish-language films
2004 documentary films
Argentine documentary films
2000s Argentine films